A Próxima Atração is a Brazilian telenovela produced and broadcast by TV Globo. It premiered on 26 October 1970 and ended on 17 April 1971, with a total of 150 episodes. It's the seventh "novela das sete" to be aired at the timeslot. It is created by Vicente Sesso and directed by Régis Cardoso.

Cast

References

External links 
 

1970 telenovelas
TV Globo telenovelas
Brazilian telenovelas
1970 Brazilian television series debuts
1971 Brazilian television series endings
Portuguese-language telenovelas